Karin Orth (born 1963) is a German historian, known for her research into the Nazi concentration camps.

Works

References

1963 births
Historians of Nazism
Living people